Alzoniella slovenica is a species of very small or minute freshwater snail with an operculum, an aquatic gastropod mollusk in the family Hydrobiidae, which are sometimes known as the snouted water snails.

Shell description

Alzoniella slovenica is blind.

Distribution 
Distribution of this species is western carpathian.

This species is found in the White Carpathians. It is endemic to Moravia (Czech Republic) and in Slovakia.

Its conservation status in the Czech Republic is endangered and it is "rare“ in Slovakia.

Biotope
It is a crenobiotic species: it lives in groundwater and it can be found in water wells.

References

Alzoniella
Hydrobiidae
Gastropods described in 1964